Mariental railway station is a railway station serving the town of Mariental in Namibia. It is part of the TransNamib Railway, and is located along the Windhoek to Upington line that connects Namibia with South Africa.

Railway stations in Namibia
TransNamib Railway
Buildings and structures in Hardap Region